Koratty Pattanam Railway Gate is a 2011 Malayalam film directed by debutant Hafiz Ismail, starring mainly newcomers. The leade roles are by Ajay Natesh and Mallika.

Plot
It is based on a Koratty colony where two gangs are in an open fight that often emerges from a long-standing cut throat rivalry between the two.

Cast
 Ajay Nataraj
 Mallika
 Premnath
 Rajeev Rajan
 Miraj Bhasker
 Shammi Thilakan
 T. S. Raju
 Kalasala Babu
 Narayanankutty
 Bineesh Kodiyeri
 Nelson
 Sajeer
 Shafeek
 Seema G. Nair
 Zeenath
 Shalini
 Krishna
 Sonia
 Master Sreekailas
 Master Aashik

References

External links
 Malayalasangeetham
 Kerala9
 Chithrasala

2010s Malayalam-language films
Indian crime action films
Films about organised crime in India
2011 crime action films
2011 films